Meysam Latifi born 1979 in Hamedan, is an Iranian politician and Vice President and Head of the Administrative and Recruitment Affairs Organisation of Iran. He graduated  PhD in human resource management.

References

1979 births
Living people
Iranian politicians
Vice presidents